Brothers in Blood, published in 2014 is the thirteenth volume of the Eagles of the Empire series by Simon Scarrow.

Cover description
A messenger on the streets of Rome has been intercepted and tortured, revealing a plot to sabotage the Roman army's campaign against Caratacus, commander of Britannia's native tribes. A treacherous agent's mission is to open a second front of attack against them and eliminate the two Roman soldiers who could stand in the way. Unwarned, Cato and Macro are with the Roman army pursuing Caratacus and his men through the mountains of Britannia. Defeating Caratacus finally seems within their grasp. But the plot against the two heroes threatens not only their military goals but also their lives.

References 

2014 British novels
Eagles of the Empire
Novels set in the 1st century
Headline Publishing Group books